Ciril Horjak (alias Dr Horowitz; born December 1975, in Slovenj Gradec) is a Slovene comic book artist and book and newspaper illustrator. His comics have been published in Stripburger, in Quadrado from Portugal, in Shtumm from Germany and Le Martien from France.

Life and work
He studied at the Academy of Fine Arts and Design and works as a free-lance illustrator. He has provided more than 1200 illustrations for the Večer newspaper since 2007. In 2017, he authored the visual side of the Luther-Trubar app about Primož Trubar, the founder of the Slovenian language, and German Reformation, published by the Goethe Institute. He is the author of the very first educational comic book ever to be dedicated to endodontics.

Awards
In 2016, he received an award by Society of Slovenian Journalists.

In 2010, he received an award by Slovenian Institute for Adult Education.

References

Slovenian illustrators
Slovenian caricaturists
Living people
1975 births
University of Ljubljana alumni